Taisiya Aleksandrovna Vilkova (born October 25, 1996) is a Russian actress. She appeared in over 30 films.

Biography
Taisiya was born in Moscow on October 25, 1996, to actor Alexander Vilkov and producer Daria Goncharova. She was eight when her parents separated. Actor Mikhail Polosukhin is her step-father. She has two half brothers. In 2011, she began working as the host of the Disney channel. In 2013, Taisiya entered the Moscow Art Theatre School.

In March 2020, she married actor and director Semyon Serzin. In July of the same year, the couple had a daughter, Seraphim.

Selected filmography

References

External links 
 Taisiya Vilkova on kino-teatr.ru

1996 births
Living people
Actresses from Moscow
Russian child actresses
Russian film actresses
Russian television actresses
Russian stage actresses
21st-century Russian actresses